23S rRNA (pseudouridine1915-N3)-methyltransferase (YbeA, RlmH, pseudouridine methyltransferase, m3Psi methyltransferase, Psi1915-specific methyltransferase, rRNA large subunit methyltransferase H) is an enzyme with systematic name S-adenosyl-L-methionine:23S rRNA (pseudouridine1915-N3)-methyltransferase. This enzyme catalyses the following chemical reaction

 S-adenosyl-L-methionine + pseudouridine1915 in 23S rRNA  S-adenosyl-L-homocysteine + N3-methylpseudouridine1915 in 23S rRNA

YbeA does not methylate uridine at position 1915.

References

External links 
 

EC 2.1.1